Ilie Ștefan Ivanciuc (born July 26, 1971 in Moara) is a Romanian former rugby union player who played as a fly-half.

He is currently the coach of Italian club Modena Rugby.

Club career
During his career Ivanciuc played for Romanian club CSM Suceava. and abroad in Italy for Viterbo and Modena.

International career
Ivanciuc gathered 6 caps for Romania, from his debut in 1991 to his last game in 1995. He scored 2 penalties and 1 drop-goal during his international career, 9 points on aggregate. He was a member of his national side for the 2nd and 3rd Rugby World Cups in 1991 and 1995 and played 4 group matches and scored a penalty against Springboks in Pool A match held in Cape Town, on 30 May 1995 and a drop-goal against Wallabies on 3 June 1995 in the same pool.

References

External links

1971 births
Living people
Romanian rugby union players
Romanian rugby union coaches
Romania international rugby union players
Rugby union fly-halves
People from Suceava County
Romanian expatriate sportspeople in Italy